Ole Munch Ræder (3 May 1815 – 10 March 1895) was a Norwegian jurist and diplomat.

He was born at Kongsvinger in Hedmark, Norway.  He was the son of Johan Christopher Ræder and Karen Sophie Hedevig Munch. He was the brother of Jacques Ræder,  Johan Georg Ræder  and Nicolai Ditlev Ammon Ræder. His father was a Norwegian military officer and his maternal grandfather had been a Danish military officer. 
 
He grew up in Trondheim and in 1832 graduated  at Trondheim Cathedral School. In  1839, he graduated  as a cand. jur. from the Royal Frederik University in Kristiania (now Oslo, Norway,

He joined the Norwegian Audit Department in 1839 as the Norwegian Ministry of Justice in 1840. During the years 1842-1844, he was traveling in Denmark, Germany, Switzerland and Italy, and from 1846 to 1849 in the United States with state support to study various jury systems. He was consul for Sweden-Norway at Malta from 1861 to 1869, in Alexandria from 1869 to 1871, at Malta from 1871 to 1874, and in Hamburg from 1874 to 1891. He took leave and returned to Norway in 1891. 
He was Commander, First Class of the Order of St. Olav and Commander, First Class of the Order of Vasa.

Selected works

References

1815 births
1895 deaths
People from Kongsvinger
People educated at the Trondheim Cathedral School
University of Oslo alumni
19th-century Norwegian lawyers
Norwegian diplomats
Commanders First Class of the Order of Vasa
Recipients of the St. Olav's Medal